Sperumalpatti (selvakulam perumalpatti) is a small village situated near Madurai District of Tamil Nadu, India.

Villages in Madurai district